Gyponana is a genus of leafhoppers in the family Cicadellidae found mainly in North America. There are at least 90 described species in Gyponana, but most are difficult to identify based on external characteristics.
 Species are usually green in appearance, sometimes with a blue tint, but some species have fully- and partially-pink forms.

Distribution
This genus is found mostly throughout North and South America. It's very diverse throughout the United States, despite some species being morphologically identical. The genus has potentially been introduced to Europe and has been recorded in Borneo.

Subgenera and Species
There are four subgenera of Gyponana. All but one are monospecific. Rugosana was once considered a subgenus of Gyponana, but was elevated to the status of genus after DNA barcode testing provided greater insight into its lineage.

Subgenus Clovana
A single species found in the southwestern United States of America.

 Gyponana omani DeLong, 1942

Subgenus Gyponana
By far the largest subgenus, containing the majority of the species in the genus.

 Gyponana acia DeLong, 1942
 Gyponana aculeata DeLong, 1942
 Gyponana amara DeLong, 1942
 Gyponana ambita DeLong, 1942
 Gyponana alternata DeLong, 1983
 Gyponana ambita DeLong & Freytag, 1964
 Gyponana ampla DeLong & Freytag, 1964
 Gyponana angulata (Spangberg, 1878)
 Gyponana angustana DeLong, 1983
 Gyponana apicata DeLong & Freytag, 1964
 Gyponana ara DeLong & Freytag, 1964
 Gyponana attenuens Hamilton, 1982
 Gyponana avara DeLong, 1942
 Gyponana bernardina DeLong, 1984
 Gyponana bocasa DeLong & Wolda, 1984
 Gyponana bocasana DeLong & Wolda, 1984
 Gyponana boquetea DeLong & Wolda, 1982
 Gyponana brevidens DeLong & Freytag, 1964
 Gyponana brevispina DeLong & Freytag, 1964
 Gyponana brevita DeLong, 1942
 Gyponana cacumina DeLong, 1942
 Gyponana caduca DeLong & Freytag, 1964
 Gyponana cana Burmeister, 1839
 Gyponana chiricana DeLong & Wolda, 1984
 Gyponana chiriquea DeLong & Wolda, 1982
 Gyponana colorada DeLong & Wolda, 1984
 Gyponana crenata de Conconi, 1972
 Gyponana cunea DeLong, 1942
 Gyponana curvata DeLong & Freytag, 1964
 Gyponana delicata Fowler, 1903
 Gyponana dentata de Conconi, 1972
 Gyponana desa DeLong, 1942
 Gyponana designata DeLong & Freytag, 1964
 Gyponana elongata Ball, 1935
 Gyponana expanda DeLong, 1942
 Gyponana extenda DeLong, 1942
 Gyponana fastiga DeLong, 1942
 Gyponana fimbriata DeLong, 1942
 Gyponana flavilineata Fitch, 1851
 Gyponana fortuna DeLong & Wolda, 1982
 Gyponana fructa DeLong & Freytag, 1964
 Gyponana geminata (Osborn, 1905)
 Gyponana germari (Stal, 1864)
 Gyponana gibbera DeLong, 1942
 Gyponana gladia DeLong, 1942
 Gyponana impeta DeLong & Wolda, 1982
 Gyponana laminella DeLong, 1983
 Gyponana librata DeLong, 1942
 Gyponana longula DeLong & Freytag, 1964
 Gyponana luisa DeLong, 1984
 Gyponana luxuria DeLong, 1983
 Gyponana mali DeLong, 1942
 Gyponana marita DeLong & Freytag, 1964
 Gyponana minuta DeLong, 1983
 Gyponana morosita DeLong, 1942
 Gyponana octolineata Say, 1825
 Gyponana offula DeLong, 1942
 Gyponana ortha DeLong, 1942
 Gyponana palma DeLong, 1942
 Gyponana palmula DeLong & Freytag, 1964
 Gyponana parallela DeLong, 1942
 Gyponana penna DeLong & Freytag, 1964
 Gyponana pingua DeLong, 1942
 Gyponana praelonga DeLong, 1942
 Gyponana procera DeLong, 1942
 Gyponana protenta DeLong, 1942
 Gyponana quebecensis (Provancher, 1872)
 Gyponana redita DeLong & Freytag, 1964
 Gyponana rubralineata DeLong & Freytag, 1972
 Gyponana salsa DeLong, 1942
 Gyponana serrula DeLong & Freytag, 1964
 Gyponana serrulata de Conconi, 1972
 Gyponana sincera DeLong & Freytag, 1964
 Gyponana sonora Hamilton, 1982
 Gyponana striata (Burmeister, 1839)
 Gyponana subvirida DeLong & Freytag, 1964
 Gyponana suda DeLong, 1984
 Gyponana tenella Spångberg, 1878
 Gyponana torqua DeLong, 1983
 Gyponana toxotes Hamilton, 1982
 Gyponana trigona DeLong, 1942
 Gyponana trirama DeLong & Freytag, 1964
 Gyponana tubera DeLong, 1942
 Gyponana unicolor Stål, 1942
 Gyponana vasta DeLong, 1942
 Gyponana vincula DeLong, 1942

Subgenus Pandara
A single species.

 Gyponana eleganta DeLong & Freytag, 1972

Subgenus Sternana
A single species.

 Gyponana tenuis DeLong & Freytag, 1964

Incertae sedis

 Gyponana secunda Freytag & DeLong, 1975

References

External links

 

Iassinae
 Cicadellidae genera